The 2008 Sunderland Council election took place on 1 May 2008 to elect members of Sunderland Metropolitan Borough Council in Tyne and Wear, England. One third of the council was up for election and the Labour Party stayed in overall control of the council.

Background
Before the election the council had 53 Labour, 17 Conservative, 4 independents and 1 Liberal Democrat councillors. 25 seats were contested in the election with a record 70,828 voters being registered to vote by post, a third of all registered voters.

In the period since the previous local elections, the Conservatives had won a seat from Labour in a by-election in September 2007 in Washington East. Two Labour councillors who had left the party in November 2006 to sit as Independents, George Blyth in Doxford and Bryn Sidaway in Hendon, retired at this election.

Election result
The results saw Labour remain in control of the council, but with a reduced majority after the Conservative Party gained 5 seats, including 4 from Labour. The Conservatives gained 2 seats from Labour in Washington and a seat each in Ryhope and St Chads, while also taking a seat from an independent, formerly Labour, councillor in Doxford. The Conservative gains took the party to 22 seats, compared to 48 for Labour. Labour also lost 2 seats to independents in Copt Hill and Houghton wards, but did take one seat back in Hendon which had been held by an independent. This meant there were 4 independents on the council, while the Liberal Democrats remained on 1 seat. Overall turnout in the election was 34.9%.

The leader of the Conservatives on the council, Lee Martin, put the Labour losses partly down to national issues such as the abolition of the 10 pence income tax rate and partly down to local issues. The Labour leader of the council described the results as "mid-term blues", while the defeat of the Labour cabinet member Joseph Lawson in Houghton ward to an independent was put down to plans to shut a quarry in the area.

This resulted in the following composition of the Council:

Ward results

The incumbent Labour councillor, George Blyth, had been elected in 2004 as a Labour candidate, but subsequently left the party to sit as an Independent councillor, and retired at this election.

The incumbent Labour councillor, Bryn Sidaway, had been elected in 2004 as a Labour candidate, but subsequently left the party to sit as an Independent councillor, and retired at this election.

References

2008 English local elections
2008
21st century in Tyne and Wear